Valyettan ( Elder brother) is a 2000 Indian Malayalam-language action drama film directed by Shaji Kailas and scripted by Ranjith. It stars Mammootty, Shobana, Sai Kumar, N. F. Varghese, Siddique and Manoj K Jayan. It was remade in Kannada as Jyeshta by director Suresh Krissna with Vishnuvardhan in the lead role. The film was a commercial success and was the third highest grossing Malayalam film of the year 2000.

Plot
Arakkal Kuttikrishnan Nair loses a civil case against his nephew Arakkal Madhavanunni and has to give up the ancestral home, which he has been holding illegally for past long years. Kuttikrishnan Nair's son Patteri Sivaraman takes it as a prestige issue and decides to finish out Madhavanunni, with the help of his trusted lieutenant Nedungadi. Sivaraman has a deep hatred and enmity towards Madhavanuni since childhood and both had involved in several fistfights. Nedungadi sends Varoli Abu to shoot down either Madhavanunni or one among his brothers on their arrival at the house, but the timely intervention of Madhavanunni saves them. Madhavanunni is a self made rich businessman, who owns several properties inside and outside Kerala. 

After the suicide of his parents, Madhavanunni had taken care of his brothers: Raghu, Dasan, Appu and Shankaran Kutty, who all love and respect him. Ramankutty Kaimal, the old caretaker of their property also enjoys a good relationship with Madhavanunni. At his college, Appu is harassed by Subair, the younger brother of Madhavanunni's rival Mambaram Bava Haji. With the help of Kattipalli Pappan, a notorious criminal, Appu thrashes Subair, who dies accidentally and is later arrested for the murder, but is released on bail and Kattipalli Pappan is arrested for the murder. While going to prison, Pappan requests Madhavanunni to take care of his sister Lakshmi, which Madhavanuni accepts. 

Madhavanunni brings Lakshmi to his home and is treated as a member of their family. Mambaram Bawa Haji is now looking for a chance to avenge Madhavanunni for his brother's death, where Patteri Sivaraman lends a helping hand to Bawa Haji. One day, Lakshmi is found dead at the pond and Dasan is arrested, but Raghu surrenders to the cops in order to save Dasan. Upon release from prison, Pappan returns to kill Raghu for murdering Lakshmi, but later discovers that Patteri Shivaraman was the mastermind behind Lakshmi's murder. Enraged, Madhavanunni, along with his brothers and Pappan heads to Patteri Sivaraman's house and thrashes him, but later leaves him on the request of Kuttikrishnan Nair and his family. Patteri Sivaraman realizes his mistake and the families reconciles with each other.

Cast
Mammootty as  Arakkal Madhavanunni
Shobana as Devi, Madhavanunni's wife
Sai Kumar as Patteri Sivaraman Nair
N. F. Varghese as Mambaram Bava Haji
Siddique as Raghu, Madhavanunni's younger brother
Manoj K. Jayan as Dasan, Madhavanunni's adopted brother
Sudheesh as Shankaran Kutty, Madhavanunni's younger brother
Vijayakumar as Appu, Madhavanunni's youngest brother
Innocent as Ramankutty Kaimal, Dasan's father
Kalabhavan Mani as Kattipalli Pappan
Bheeman Raghu as Nedungadi
Sukumari as Kunjikavamma
Augustine as Gangadharan
Captain Raju as DySP Mohammed Ilias, Madhavanunni's friend
Poornima Mohan as Lakshmi, Pappan's sister
Kozhikode Narayanan Nair as Arakkal Kuttikrishnan Nair, Sivaraman's father and Madhavanunni's uncle
V. K. Sreeraman as Soopi Haji
G. K. Pillai as SP Purushothaman IPS
Sadiq as Adv. Bharathan Marar
Subair as SI Ajith Kumar
Irshad as Subair, Bava's brother
Ramu as CI Chandramohan
Kunchan as Chathunni
Valsala Menon as Sivaraman's mother
Dhanya Menon as Thankamani
Biyon as Young Madhavanunni
 Arun Kumar as Young Shankaran Kutty
Ajith Kollam as Marodi Abu
Thalapathy Dinesh as Goonda
Yamuna as Sivaraman's wife
Meena Ganesh as Chathunni's wife
Santhakumari as Ajith Kumar's mother
Remadevi as Vilasini Teacher
Haseena Bhanu as Dancer in the song Sivamallipoo pozhikkum
Ponnamma Babu as Bava's wife
 Nizzar as Soopi Haji's daughter's love
Thalapathy Dinesh
The film was released in Kerala on 10 September 2000.

Box office
The film was the third highest grossing Malayalam film of the year 2000 after Narasimham and Thenkasipattanam.

Soundtrack

References

External links
 

2000 films
2000s Malayalam-language films
Malayalam films remade in other languages
Indian action films
Films shot in Thrissur
Films shot in Palakkad
Films shot in Ottapalam
Films directed by Shaji Kailas
Films scored by Mohan Sithara
2000 action films